Golden Temple may refer to:

Golden Temple,Amritsar,Punjab,India (Harmandir Sahib)

Places
 Harmandir Sahib, commonly known as "The Golden Temple," in Amritsar, Punjab, India
 Hiranya Varna Mahavihar, informally called "Golden Temple," in Patan, Nepal
 Golden Temple Park, a Taoist temple in Yunnan, China
 Golden Temple of Dambulla, a cave temple complex in Sri Lanka
 Golden Temple, Sripuram a temple in Vellore district, Tamil Nadu, India
 Durgiana Temple, Amritsar, Punjab, India

Other
 The Golden Temple (film), a 2012 documentary film directed by Enrico Masi
 Golden Temple Mail, an express train in Punjab, India

See also
 Temple of the Golden Pavilion (disambiguation)
 The Temple of Gold, a 1957 novel by William Goldman